Jesse Column Dickey (February 27, 1808 – February 19, 1890) was a Whig member of the U.S. House of Representatives from Pennsylvania.

Biography
Jesse C. Dickey was born in New Castle, Pennsylvania. He moved with his parents to New London, Chester County, Pennsylvania, in 1812. He graduated from New London Academy and began teaching school at Hopewell Academy in 1828. He also engaged in agricultural pursuits.

Dickey was a member of the Pennsylvania House of Representatives from 1842 to 1845. He elected as a Whig to the Thirty-first Congress. He was an unsuccessful candidate for reelection to the Thirty-second Congress. He served as quartermaster and later paymaster in the United States Army during the American Civil War.

On December 11, 1834, he married Margaret J. Dickey, the daughter of Col. David Dickey of Hopewell Cotton Mill, near Oxford, Chester County, Pennsylvania. They had nine children. He died in New London in 1891, and was interred in New London Presbyterian Church Cemetery.

References
 Retrieved on 2008-02-14
The Political Graveyard
History of Chester County, Pennsylvania with Genealogical and Biographical Sketches (1881) and Families and Persons. By J. Smith Futhey and Gilbert Cope.

External links

1808 births
1890 deaths
Members of the Pennsylvania House of Representatives
Union Army soldiers
American Presbyterians
Whig Party members of the United States House of Representatives from Pennsylvania
19th-century American politicians